Nivaldo Rodrigues Ferreira (born 22 June 1988), known as Nivaldo, is a Brazilian footballer who plays as a forward for English club Bootle, on loan from Radcliffe.

Career

Early career
On 16 August 2012, Nivaldo played on trial for FC Ufa reserve team. In July 2013, Nivaldo joined Sibir Novosibirsk, going on to make his debut for them in the Russian Football League against FC Ufa. On 14 August 2014, Nivaldo signed for Luch-Energiya Vladivostok. On 25 August 2016, Nivaldo signed a one-year contract with Yenisey Krasnoyarsk. Nivaldo was released by Yenisey on 31 January 2017.

Lokomotiv Tashkent
On 1 February 2018, Nivaldo signed on loan for Lokomotiv Tashkent until 30 June 2018.

SC Chaika
In summer 2021 he moved to SC Chaika, in Ukrainian Second League  and on 14 July 2021 he scored two goals for SC Chaika in the friendly match against FC Chernihiv in Plysky ended 3-0. On 25 July he made his debut with the new team in the 2021-22 Ukrainian Second League season against Bukovyna Chernivtsi. On 18 August he made his debut in the 2021–22 Ukrainian Cup against FC Chernihiv.

Radcliffe
On 12 August 2022 he moved to English club Radcliffe of the Northern Premier League.

Bootle (loan)
In October 2022, Nivaldo signed for Bootle on loan.

Personal life
Nivaldo is married to Ukrainian Tennis player Anna Karavayeva, with whom he has two children.

Career statistics

Club

Honours
Dinamo Brest
 Belarusian Cup: 2017–18
 Belarusian Super Cup: 2018

References

External links
Radcliffe F.C. Official Website
Career summary by sportbox.ru  

1988 births
Living people
Brazilian footballers
Brazilian expatriate footballers
Sportspeople from Pernambuco
Association football midfielders
FC Atyrau players
FC Sibir Novosibirsk players
FC Luch Vladivostok players
FC Yenisey Krasnoyarsk players
FC Gomel players
FC Dynamo Brest players
PFC Lokomotiv Tashkent players
Gudja United F.C. players
FC Belshina Bobruisk players
FC Isloch Minsk Raion players
SC Chaika Petropavlivska Borshchahivka players
Campeonato Brasileiro Série C players
Kazakhstan Premier League players
Belarusian Premier League players
Uzbekistan Super League players
Maltese Premier League players
Ukrainian Second League players
Brazilian expatriate sportspeople in Russia
Brazilian expatriate sportspeople in Belarus
Brazilian expatriate sportspeople in Uzbekistan
Brazilian expatriate sportspeople in Malta
Brazilian expatriate sportspeople in Ukraine
Expatriate footballers in Kazakhstan
Expatriate footballers in Russia
Expatriate footballers in Belarus
Expatriate footballers in Uzbekistan
Expatriate footballers in Malta
Expatriate footballers in Ukraine
Northern Premier League players
Brazilian expatriate sportspeople in England
Radcliffe F.C. players